Boban Jović (born 25 June 1991) is a retired Slovenian footballer who played as a defender.

Club career
Jović started playing football at his local club Šampion, but moved to Aluminij in his teens. Even though he was playing in Slovenian second division, he was part of the under-19 national team, which qualified for the 2009 European Championship.

After the tournament, Jović moved to Olimpija Ljubljana and played 16 games in the 2009–10 season, mainly as a defensive midfielder. He became an indispensable member of the team during the next season, playing 30 games and starting to make the right back position his own.

On 8 August 2017 he was loaned from Bursaspor to Śląsk Wrocław.

In November 2019, Jović announced his retirement from professional football.

References

External links

 Profile at NZS 
 
 

1991 births
Living people
Sportspeople from Celje
Slovenian footballers
Association football fullbacks
Slovenia youth international footballers
Slovenia under-21 international footballers
Slovenia international footballers
Slovenian Second League players
Slovenian PrvaLiga players
Ekstraklasa players
Süper Lig players
NK Aluminij players
NK Olimpija Ljubljana (2005) players
Wisła Kraków players
Bursaspor footballers
Śląsk Wrocław players
Slovenian expatriate footballers
Slovenian expatriate sportspeople in Poland
Expatriate footballers in Poland
Slovenian expatriate sportspeople in Turkey
Expatriate footballers in Turkey